José Câmnate na Bissign (born Mansôa, 28 May 1953) is a Guinea-Bissauan Roman Catholic bishop. He was the first native bishop of Guinea-Bissau, serving from 2000 to 2020.

He was ordained a priest in Bissau, at 31 December 1982, aged 29 years old. After the death of Settimio Ferrazzetta, he was appointed the second bishop of the Diocese of Bissau on 15 October 1999. He was received his episcopal consecration on 12 February 2000.

He has been involved in the dialogue between the different political and religious groups in Guinea-Bissau. He was one of the main proponents of the Commission Justice and Peace and of the Council for ecumenical dialogue, inter-religious and for the promotion of human dignity.

Pope Francis accepted his resignation on 11 July 2020.

References

External links
José Câmnate na Bissign at Catholic Hierarchy
José Câmnate Intervention at 14 October 2009 (Portuguese)

1953 births
Living people
Bissau-Guinean Roman Catholic bishops
21st-century Roman Catholic bishops in Guinea-Bissau
People from Oio Region
Roman Catholic bishops of Bissau